Sahebganj (community development block) is one of the administrative divisions of Muzaffarpur district in the Indian state of  Bihar.  It belongs to Tirhut Division. It is located 11 km Kilometres Southwest of Mehsi. 57 km towards west from District Headquarters Muzaffarpur. 

Sahebganj Pin code is 843125 and postal head office is Kurnowl.

Sahebganj is situated on the bank of river Baya. It borders Kesaria and Kalyanpur, blocks in Mehsi East Champaran district on the north, Baruraj block in Muzaffarpur district on the east, Paroo block in Muzaffarpur district on the south, and Baikunthpur block in Gopalganj district on the south. Motipur, Barauli, Marhaura, Areraj are the nearby cities to Sahebganj.

There are five ATM (P.N.B, S.B.I, B.O.B, Central bank,  INDIA1) in this town and branch of S.B.I bank, Central Bank, Bank of Baroda.

Geography
Sahebganj is located at 

It is situated at the bank of river Baya, about 52 km northwest from Muzaffarpur town (District headquarters), at the border of Muzaffarpur and East Champaran districts.

Panchayats
Panchayats in Sahebganj community development block are: Bishnupur Chak Pahad, Ahiyarpur, Baidhyanathpur, Bangra Nizamat, Basantipur, Chainpur, Basudeopur Sarai, Bishnupur Kalyan, Bishnupur Patti, Gaura, Gulab Patti, Halimpur, Hussepur Ratti, Hussepur, Sahebganj Jagdishpur, Madhopur Hazari, Nawanagar Nizamat, Paharpur Manorath, Pakri Basarat, Parsauni Raisi, Pratap Patti, Rajepur, Rampur Asli, Roop Chhapra and Saraiya. Gulab Patti is most prosperous panchayat in  Sahebganj

Demographics
In the 2001 census Sahebganj Block had a population of 183,118.

References

Community development blocks in Muzaffarpur district